The 1980 Romania rugby union tour of Ireland was a series of six matches played by the Romania national rugby union team in Ireland and England in October 1980. The tour was essentially a visit to Ireland, with a single match against Leicester (to celebrate that club's centenary) being played in England. Romania won four of their six matches, lost one and drew the other. The draw came in the international match against Ireland, which the home team did not consider a full international match. This was rated a major result for Romania, who were hopeful at the time of joining the Five Nations Championship, and the Rothmans Rugby Yearbook's review of the tour stated that "any lingering doubts about the ability of the Romanians to pose a challenge to the home countries were dispelled".

Matches
Scores and results list Romania's points tally first.

Touring party
Manager: Theodor Rădulescu
Assistant Managers: Valeriu Irimescu
Captain: Mircea Paraschiv

Backs

Forwards

References

Sources

1980 rugby union tours
1980
1980
1980–81 in Irish rugby union
1980–81 in European rugby union
1980–81 in English rugby union